Don't Vote Urza.cz. is a Czech political party, founded by the anarcho-capitalist Martin Urza before the 2021 Czech legislative election. He stated that he was running, but did not want to be elected. The full, official name of the party is Urza.cz: We don't want your votes; freedom cannot be invoked. We will reject any political function; we do not want to tell people how to live. We have a different vision. We are going in a different direction – you can find it on the website www.urza.cz.

Program 
The party rejects all political functions, which it justifies by saying that no one should rule anyone by force. Even if elected, the party says it would refuse to accept any position, and would resign any mandate obtained in the event of election (if all the party's alternates gradually reject the mandate, this mandate will remain vacant until the end of the election period).

The main goal of Urza.cz is to provoke a society-wide debate on what it argues is the harmful role of the state in certain areas, and the implementation of a free market in these areas. The party further claims that the state interferes too much in the freedom of citizens, and should therefore limit itself. The ideas of the movement are based on anarcho-capitalism. Urza describes his political convictions in his work.

History 
Urza established the party in April 2021, when he began collecting signatures among his supporters. By July, 1,618 signatures had been collected (1,000 are needed to establish a political party), but the Ministry of the Interior rejected the first attempt to register the party. The movement therefore amended its statutes and the second attempt to register was successful.

Tereza Urzová (née Sladkovská), the lead candidate in the Pilsen Region, was previously a member of Svobodní, and ran for the European Parliament in 2014.

2021 elections 

The following persons are candidates in individual regions (the party is also specific in that, apart from the Pilsen Region, only one person is running for it in each region):

Election results

Chamber of Deputies

References

External links 

 

Political parties in the Czech Republic
Anarcho-capitalist organizations
Libertarian parties
Political parties established in 2021
2021 establishments in the Czech Republic